Netechma pyrrhocolona is a species of moth of the family Tortricidae. It is found in Colombia and Ecuador (Pichincha and Carchi provinces).

References

Moths described in 1926
Netechma